Inhulets (or Inhuletsky) District is the southernmost urban district of Kryvyi Rih City, central-southern Ukraine. Named after the river Inhulets that flows through the area. In the year 2002, Inhuletsky District absorbed a former town of Inhulets now it is an exclave-neighbourhood of Kryvyi Rih.

On 2 April 2022 Inhuletsky District was fired at from multiple rocket launchers Whirlwind (Smerch) by the invading Russia forces, damaging a gas station, a school and a few private living houses, resulting in no deaths. Later that year, several civilians were killed by rocket attack of Russian troops on the center of the neighborhood Inhulets.

Population

References

Urban districts of Kryvyi Rih